Al Mansuriyah District is a district of the Al Hudaydah Governorate, Yemen. As of 2003, the district had a population of 44,744 inhabitants.

References

Districts of Al Hudaydah Governorate